The Memorial to the Great Exhibition is an outdoor monument commemorating the Great Exhibition (1851) and depicting Albert, Prince Consort, designed by Joseph Durham with modifications by Sydney Smirke and located south of Royal Albert Hall in London, United Kingdom. Originally installed in the Royal Horticultural Society gardens in 1863, it was relocated to its current site during 1891–1893 when the gardens were reconstructed and Prince Consort Road was created.

See also
 1863 in art
 Albert Memorial

References

Further reading

External links
 

1863 establishments in the United Kingdom
1863 sculptures
Grade II listed statues in the City of Westminster
Grade II listed monuments and memorials
Monuments and memorials in London
Monuments and memorials to Albert, Prince Consort
Outdoor sculptures in London
Great Exhibition